Chloé Henry (born 5 March 1987) is a Belgian gymnast and pole vaulter. She is multiple times Belgian Champion and National Record holder in pole vault. She is also known for her participation in Ninja Warrior France season 2. She made it to the semi-final where she became the last woman standing, just missing out on the finals.

Career

Artistic gymnastics 

Chloé Henry was born 5 March 1987 in Corpus Christi, Texas, and lived in the United States until she was eight years old, where she started artistic gymnastics.  She moved to Belgium where she started her international artistic gymnastics career. She participated in a number of European Championships and one World Championship. She was also selected to compete at the 2007 World Championship, but dislocated her elbow prior to the championship, which took her out of the running for the 2008 Olympic Games in Beijing, China. In 2006, she was the Belgian Champion. In 2008 she refocused her objectives to pole vault.

Five titles in three years 

After five months in pole vault she received her first medal at the National Championship, when she jumped over 3m35 to take home the bronze. In 2012, she became for the first time Belgian indoor Champion, a title maintained in 2013, 2014, and 2015. In 2012, 2014, and 2015 she also became the Outdoor Belgian Champion.

National records 

Henry holds the indoor and outdoor National Record. She bettered a 10-year-old national record with a jump over 4m22 in December 2011 in Sittard, Netherlands, Belgian indoor record. In 2012, 2013, and 2014 she increased the record to 4m29 at the KBC Nacht, 4m33, 4m41, and 4m42 respectively national record.
During an official competition in Brussels, Belgium she also jumped a Belgian record at 4m26, which was later not recognised by the Flemish Federation.

Making History 

Henry was the first Belgian female pole vaulter to ever qualify for a European Championships when she jumped the qualifying standard, 4m40, on 21/04/2016 in Chula Vista, CA, USA for the 2016 European Championships in Amsterdam.

Club 
 2016- RESC, Royal Excelsior Sports Club Brussels
 2014-2016 USBW, Union Sportive Braine-Waterloo
 2008-2014 KVAC, Koninklijke Vilvoorde Atletiek Club

Belgium Champion 

Outdoor

Indoor

Personal records

National records

Awards

Artistic gymnastics 
 2007: 38th European Championship in Amsterdam, NED
 2007:  All-Around Belgian Championship - 55,325 p (disputed)
 2007:  Belgian Championship event final, Bars
 2007:  Belgian Championship event final, Vault
 2007:  Belgian Championship event final, Floor
 2006: 77th World Championship in Aarhus
 2006: 21st All-Around European Championship in Volos
 2006: 77th World Championship in Aarhus
 2006: 8th World Cup Final, bars, Glasgow, SCO
 2006: 8th World Cup Final, bars, Gent, BEL
 2006:  All-Around Belgian Championship
 2006:  Belgian Championship event final, Bars
 2005:  All-Around Belgian Championship
 2005: 32nd All-Around European Championship in Debrecen, HUN
 2004: 35th All-Around European Championship in Amsterdam, NED

Pole Vault 
 2015:  Belgian Championship – 4,10 m
 2015:  Summer Universiade in Gwangju, Kor – 4,40 m
 2015:  Belgian Championship – 4,20 m
 2014:  Belgian Championship – 4,20 m
 2014:  Belgian Championship indoor – 4,25 m
 2013: 6e Summer Universiade in Kazan, Rus – 4,30 m
 2013:  Belgian Championship – 4,20 m
 2013:  Belgian Championship indoor – 4,05 m
 2012:  Belgian Championship – 4,20 m
 2012:  Belgian Championship indoor – 4,25 m
 2011:  Belgian Championship – 3,85 m
 2011:  Belgian Championship indoor – 3,85 m
 2010:  Belgian Championship – 3,70 m
 2009:  Belgian Championship – 3,85 m
 2008:  Belgian Championship – 3,35 m

References

External links 
 Personal website
 

Belgian female pole vaulters
Belgian female artistic gymnasts
Universiade medalists in athletics (track and field)
1987 births
Living people
Sportspeople from Corpus Christi, Texas
Universiade bronze medalists for Belgium
Medalists at the 2015 Summer Universiade